Foreign espionage in New Zealand, while likely not as extensive as in many larger countries, has nevertheless taken place. The New Zealand Security Intelligence Service (NZSIS), which has primary responsibility for counter-intelligence work, states that there are foreign intelligence agents working in New Zealand today.

Potential objectives
New Zealand's relatively small population, economy, and military mean that espionage against New Zealand is unlikely to be a priority for foreign intelligence agencies. Nevertheless, the New Zealand government asserts that a limited amount of espionage does take place. Former Prime Minister Sir Geoffrey Palmer has stated that "it would be wrong to assume New Zealand was free from foreign threats [or] that New Zealand may be too small and unimportant to be of great interest to hostile foreign-intelligence organisations".

One potential reason for foreign interest in New Zealand might be its close intelligence links with larger Western nations – as part of the Five Eyes alliance, New Zealand receives more information than it might otherwise be expected to hold. Foreign intelligence agencies might therefore see New Zealand as a "back door" into the intelligence worlds of the United States, United Kingdom, and Australia. At times, New Zealand's allies have expressed concerns about both Soviet and Chinese espionage and influence in New Zealand.

Also of potential interest was New Zealand's nuclear-free legislation, which prompted a rift between New Zealand and the United States. Soviet defector Oleg Gordievsky alleges that the Soviet Union was interested in New Zealand's policy, and attempted to promote it in Europe, perhaps in the hope of weakening the United States' position in the Cold War nuclear arms race. The Soviet Union was frequently accused of encouraging those elements in New Zealand which it saw as beneficial to its interests – the pro-Soviet Socialist Unity Party was one alleged beneficiary, as were certain militant trade unions.

On occasion, foreign spies may be active in New Zealand for reasons not connected with the country itself – the French bombing of the Rainbow Warrior was aimed at Greenpeace rather than New Zealand. China is also sometimes alleged to target New Zealand-based Chinese democracy activists and Falun Gong members more often than it targets the New Zealand government.

It is alleged that New Zealand has been used as a "training ground" for other operations – it is a developed, English-speaking country, but was seen as less dangerous than more major targets.

Alleged espionage activity

Soviet Union
Throughout the Cold War, a number of people in New Zealand, both Soviet citizens and New Zealanders, were accused of working for Soviet intelligence agencies. Many were diplomats connected to the Soviet embassy in Wellington. The SIS was active in monitoring the activities of Soviet diplomatic personnel, conducting surveillance of the embassy compound and trailing vehicles which left it. Occasionally, diplomats were expelled on charges of espionage or interference in New Zealand political affairs.

Among the expelled diplomats were Ambassador Vsevolod Sofinsky and embassy officials Sergei Budnik and Dmitri Razgovorov. Sofinsky and Budnik were both accused in the 1980s of giving covert assistance to the Socialist Unity Party, while Razgovorov was accused in 1975 of being an agent handler for local sources (notably Bill Sutch, below). Later, in 1991, Anvar Kadyrov was expelled after illegally attempting to obtain a New Zealand passport. The "Mitrokhin Archive" claims that many Soviet spies were active in New Zealand, possibly using it as a relatively "safe" training ground for activities in other English-speaking countries.

Probably the best known New Zealander accused of being a foreign spy is Bill Sutch, a prominent diplomat and economic advisor. He was observed on several occasions meeting Dmitri Razgovorov, a Soviet diplomat, and in 1974, the SIS accused Sutch of passing information. He was acquitted in court the following year, and died shortly afterwards. The question of his guilt or innocence was, and still continues to be, a matter of considerable public debate. Former NZSIS officer Kit Bennetts has maintained that Sutch was a Soviet intelligence asset.

Another New Zealander accused of working for the Soviets was Paddy Costello, a senior diplomat – information from the Mitrokhin papers is the primary source of the allegations. He is sometimes cited as the reason Morris and Lona Cohen, both Soviet spies, were able to obtain New Zealand passports, although others claim the passports could easily have been obtained without assistance. These accusations have been challenged by author James McNeish in The Sixth Man: The Extraordinary Life of Paddy Costello.

China
Chen Yonglin and Hao Fengjun, two former diplomats of the People's Republic of China who defected to Australia, have claimed that China undertakes substantial espionage work in New Zealand. The New Zealand government declined to comment, and the Chinese government denied the claims.

In September 2017, the University of Canterbury political scientist Anne-Marie Brady alleged that the Chinese Communist Party was working with sympathetic elements within the Chinese diaspora community organisations and ethnic media including the New Zealand China Friendship Society and local chapters of the Chinese Students and Scholars Association as part of a united front strategy to advance Chinese "soft power" interests in New Zealand. Brady also alleged that National Party Member of Parliament (MP) Jian Yang and Labour Party MP Raymond Huo worked as pro-China influencers. Yang attracted media attention and scrutiny over allegations that he trained Chinese intelligence officers while teaching at the Chinese Air Force Engineering College and the Luoyang People's Liberation Army University of Foreign Languages. Huo and Yang subsequently resigned prior to the 2020 New Zealand general election after intelligence agencies raised concerns about the two MPs' connections to the Chinese Government with Prime Minister Jacinda Ardern and the-then National Party leader Todd Muller.

In November 2020, reporting by the NZ Herald revealed an individual known as "Mr H" who been sent to New Zealand in 1996 by Chinese public security bureau authorities to monitor Taiwanese and Falun Gong dissidents had failed to gain residency after having his application rejected after continuous attempts at gaining permanent residency for the past 23 years. 

In mid September 2020, the NZSIS confirmed that it was evaluating the "potential risks and security concerns" of the Chinese intelligence firm Zhenhua Data's "Overseas Key Individuals Database." The database had profiles on 730 New Zealanders including Prime Minister Ardern's mother Laurell, father Ross, sister Louse, several Cabinet ministers, former Prime Minister John Key's son Max, sportswoman Barbara Kendall, Māori leader Dame Naida Glavish, former Minister of New Zealand Ruth Richardson, and Chief Censor David Shanks. Zhenhua's database had been leaked to the American academic and China expert Professor Chris Balding, who passed the information to Australian cyber security firm Internet 2.0. The data leak was covered by several international media including the Australian Financial Review, the Washington Post, the Indian Express, the Globe and Mail, and Il Foglio.

In late March 2021, the NZSIS's Director-General Rebecca Kitteridge confirmed that its agents had discovered a New Zealander who was gathering information for an unidentified foreign intelligence agency about individuals whom an unidentified foreign state regards as dissidents. Brady claimed that the spy had been working for China, stating that "foreign interference in New Zealand almost always means the activities of the Chinese Communist Party (CCP)."

In June 2021, Brady along with the University of Auckland political scientist Stephen Noakes and the Victoria University of Wellington historian Catherine Churchman alleged that the Chinese government was spying on their lectures, by sending individuals to attend, photograph and film lectures. The Chinese Embassy dismissed claims that it was sending spies to infiltrate universities as "pure hearsay" while the Minister for Education Chris Hipkins advised universities and lecturers to inform the NZSIS if they have any concerns about espionage in their lecture halls.

On 20 July 2021, Andrew Little, the Minister in charge of the Government Communications Security Bureau (GCSB), confirmed that the signals intelligence agency had established links between Chinese state-sponsored actors known as "Advanced Persistent Threat 40" (APT40) and malicious cyber activity in New Zealand. New Zealand joined the United States, United Kingdom, Australia and the European Union in condemning the Chinese Ministry of State Security and other Chinese state-sponsored actors for their involvement in the 2021 Microsoft Exchange Server data breach. In response, the Chinese Embassy in New Zealand lodged a "solemn representation" with the New Zealand Government. The following day, Foreign Minister Nanaia Mahuta confirmed that Ministry of Foreign Affairs and Trade (MFAT) officials had met with Chinese Embassy officials in response to the cyber attack allegations.

In late October 2021, Immigration New Zealand denied a Chinese couple's residency application after the NZSIS designated them as a threat to national security due to their links to Chinese intelligence services. The NZSIS asserted that the husband and wife had "almost certainly" assisted Chinese intelligence services namely, China's Ministry of State Security (MSS) and deliberately concealed the amount of contact they had maintained with them. The couple had migrated to New Zealand in 2016 under the entrepreneur work visa scheme and established a business. The husband's lawyer stated that the man had maintained legitimate contact with Chinese intelligence services while working at a private company in China because he had helped employees to obtain visas to enter China for business purposes.

Other countries
In 1982 a group of exiled Albanians living in New Zealand, Italy and the USA attempted to infiltrate the Iron Curtain country of Albania. Their purpose was to assassinate the leader Enver Hoxha, and start a civil revolution from inside Albania. It has been said that the Central Intelligence Agency (CIA) were financing the operation, as part of their undermining of the communist regime. From all accounts the mission was discovered by Albanian forces and all of the participants were killed in a fierce machine gun battle. The Prime Minister Robert Muldoon was questioned by the media when the story leaked that New Zealand citizens were involved. The story was quickly given a media gag by the government, NZSIS and police.

In 1985, agents of the DGSE, the primary foreign intelligence agency of France, bombed the Greenpeace vessel Rainbow Warrior in Auckland harbour. Most of the crew evacuated, but one person was killed. Two of the agents were captured, pleaded guilty, and were sentenced to prison. This remains the most well known incident of foreign spies working in New Zealand, and the only terrorist attack committed in New Zealand by a foreign government.

In 2004, two Israeli citizens pleaded guilty to an illegal attempt to acquire a New Zealand passport, in a case similar to that of the Soviet Anvar Kadyrov. They were fined, given a short prison sentence, and finally deported. The government has claimed that the men were Mossad agents, although the Israeli government has not officially confirmed this. (A statement in 2005 appeared to contain a confirmation, but the Israeli government later said this was a misunderstanding).

In December 2010, US diplomatic cables obtained by WikiLeaks indicated senior New Zealand Defence Ministry officials had been spying for the United States, secretly briefing the United States embassy on Cabinet discussions about the Iraq War.

On 25 November 2020, the New Zealand Defence Force announced it was charging a soldier with seventeen offences, including four counts of espionage and two counts of attempted espionage. The Linton–based soldier is a member of white supremacist neo-Nazi group Action Zealandia, and expressed support for the Christchurch mosque shooter. He is the first New Zealand resident to be charged with espionage.

See also
Espionage
New Zealand intelligence agencies

References

Further reading

Espionage in New Zealand
Foreign relations of New Zealand